Pau d'Arco or Paudarco may refer to:

Places
 Pau d'Arco, Pará, a municipality in the state of Pará in the Northern region of Brazil
 Pau-d'Arco, Tocantins,  a municipality in the state of Tocantins in the Northern region of Brazil
 Pau d'Arco do Piauí, a municipality in the state of Piauí in the Northeast region of Brazil
 Pau d'Arco River, a river of Pará state in north-central Brazil

Plants and herbs
 Tabebuia, a genus of trees, or herbal products derived from them
 Lapacho, herbal tea made from the inner bark of some Tabebuia trees
 Handroanthus, a genus of trees known in Latin America as pau d'arco or other names, including taheebo and lapacho.